Peter Thomas Anthony Manuel (13 March 1927 – 11 July 1958) was an American-Scottish serial killer who was convicted of murdering seven people across Lanarkshire and southern Scotland between 1956 and his arrest in January 1958, and is believed to have murdered two more. Prior to his arrest, the media nicknamed the unidentified killer "the Beast of Birkenshaw". Manuel was hanged at Glasgow's Barlinnie Prison; he was the second to last prisoner to die on the Barlinnie gallows.

Early life
Peter Manuel was born to Scottish parents in New York City; the family moved to Detroit, Michigan before migrating back to Scotland in 1932, this time to Birkenshaw, Lanarkshire. During his childhood, Manuel was bullied. By the age of ten, he was known to the local police as a petty thief. At the age of 16, he committed a string of sexual attacks that resulted in his serving nine years in Peterhead Prison. In 1955, he successfully conducted his own defence on a rape charge at Airdrie Sheriff Court.

Murders
Manuel was convicted in 1958 of the murders of seven people. One case against him was thrown out of court; another, committed in England, was attributed to him.

Anne Kneilands (17): On 2 January 1956, Kneilands was stalked at the (now removed) East Kilbride golf course in the Calderwood area, where she was raped and bludgeoned to death with a length of iron. Although the police questioned him about the murder and he would confess to it two years later, Manuel escaped arrest when his father gave him an alibi. He was charged with this murder in 1958, but the case was dropped because of insufficient evidence.

Marion Watt (45), Vivienne Watt (16) and Margaret Brown (41): Marion, her daughter Vivienne, and her sister Margaret were shot dead in their home in Burnside, Lanarkshire on 17 September 1956. At the time of the murders, Manuel was out on bail for housebreaking  at a nearby colliery and officers in charge of the manhunt for the Watts' killer suspected him.  However, for a time the main suspect was Marion's husband, William, who had been on a fishing holiday in Ardrishaig, but was suspected of driving around 90 miles through the night, faking a break-in to his own house, murdering his family, and driving back.  The ferryman on the Renfrew Ferry claimed to have seen him on the ferry during the night (although this was not the most direct route) and a motorist claimed to have passed him on Loch Lomondside.  Both witnesses picked him out at an identity parade. William Watt was arrested and held on remand in Barlinnie Prison, then released two months later, after the police realized that they could not make the case against him stick, and the ferryman seemed confused about what type of car he had driven.  The police did not find any serious motive which might have led Watt to murder his family, although it emerged that he had a number of affairs during his marriage.  Police frogmen searched the Crinan Canal next to the hotel where Watt had stayed, looking for a murder weapon and bloodstained clothing, but the weapon was in another stretch of water further south.  It was established that the level of petrol in Watt's car had not fallen during his alleged overnight drive, so the police questioned petrol stations along the route to see if he had refuelled, and even speculated that he might have had a secret cache of petrol, and searched the route for it.  William Watt remained the main suspect until the Smart family murder just a few miles away, when the police realized that there was a serial killer on the loose.  At Manuel's trial, the defence argued that Watt had committed these murders.

The legal system could have come close to a miscarriage of justice in Watt's case (who would very likely have been hanged if convicted) and the evidence of these two witnesses is still not easy to explain even now. However one possible explanation is that the ferryman was a fantasist who had already seen Watt's picture in the papers, although he claimed that he had not. The other witness admitted that he did not get a clear look at Watt, but identified him based on the way he held his cigarette.

Sydney Dunn (36): Manuel is believed to have shot and killed a Newcastle upon Tyne taxi driver named Sydney Dunn, on 8 December 1957 while looking for work in Newcastle. Dunn's body was found on moorlands in Northumberland soon after, by which time Manuel had already returned to Lanarkshire.  Manuel was never tried for this murder, as it took place in a different legal jurisdiction, but 17 days after he was hanged a coroner's jury concluded Manuel had murdered Dunn, after a button found in Dunn's taxi was matched to one of his jackets.  This verdict has been accepted in many accounts of the case, but some doubts have been expressed. There are a few indications that the murderer might have been a local person, or he might have come off an Irish boat train which had recently arrived at Newcastle station. Two witnesses who spoke to the killer picked out Manuel at an identity parade, but these identifications are not always decisive (see the Watt case above).  One of these witnesses initially said that the apparent killer had a local accent, but when it was suggested to him that the killer might have come off the Irish boat train he said that he had an Irish accent, and Manuel had a Scottish accent. Manuel definitely did attend a job interview in Newcastle two days before this murder, but it is not clear that he hung around in the area; he could have just gone home to Scotland.

Isabelle Cooke (17): Cooke disappeared after leaving her Mount Vernon home to go to a dance at Uddingston Grammar School on 28 December 1957. Manuel stalked, raped and strangled her, and then buried her in a nearby field. He would later lead officers to the spot where he had disposed of her body. As with Dunn's murder twenty days earlier, Cooke's disappearance was not initially connected to Manuel.

Peter (45), Doris (42) and Michael Smart (10): The Smarts were shot dead in their Uddingston home in the early hours of 1 January 1958. After the murders, Manuel stayed in their household for nearly a week, eating leftovers from their Hogmanay meal and even feeding the family cat, before stealing some brand new banknotes that Peter Smart had kept for a holiday, and taking the family car and dumping it nearby. Manuel gave a lift in this car to a police officer investigating Isabelle Cooke's disappearance, even telling him that he felt that the police were not looking in the right places.

Arrest
Although many police officers who were familiar with Manuel suspected him of carrying out these murders, they were unable to prove his guilt until shortly after they had searched the Smarts' residence and retraced their movements in the hours before their murder, when seven £5 banknotes Peter Smart was known to have withdrawn from his bank on New Year's Eve were found to be missing from his residence, and Manuel had been discovered to be using these same banknotes to pay for drinks in several east-end Glasgow pubs. After the police arrested his father, Peter Manuel confessed to eight of these murders (but not that of Dunn) and provided incriminating information only the perpetrator could have known.

As panic of the epidemic of murders spread, Lanarkshire police were reinforced by detectives and officers from the Glasgow CID. On 14 January 1958, police arrived at the Manuels' Birkenshaw residence, armed with an arrest warrant formally charging him both with the murder of the Smart family and with breaking and entering into the Uddingston home of a family named McMunn on 4 January that year. Manuel had been asleep at the time of the police's arrival; as an officer named Andrew Stuart recited the arrest warrant to his (Manuel's) father, Manuel became verbally abusive. Informed he was to be taken to Bellshill police station for further questioning, Manuel replied: "You haven't found anything yet. You can't take me!" Shortly thereafter, he voluntarily left his home in the company of the officers.

At 11:10 that evening, Manuel was formally charged with murdering the Smart family, and with breaking into the McMunn residence.

Trial and execution
Manuel was tried for these murders in a sensational trial at the Glasgow High Court.  In a move that astounded many present, he sacked his lawyers and conducted his defence by himself.  At one point, William Watt was called as a witness. Recently injured in a road accident, he appeared on a stretcher.  Although the judge, Lord Cameron, admitted that Manuel conducted his defence "with a skill that is quite remarkable", the killer was unable to convince the jury of his innocence and he was found guilty of all charges against him, except for that of murdering Anne Kneilands, which had been dropped due to lack of evidence.  His defence in relation to the Smart killings contained some highly implausible claims, e.g. that Peter Smart had gone on a spree and killed his family and then himself, and that Peter Smart had been a friend of his who had given him keys to the Smart house. On 11 July 1958, Manuel was hanged on the gallows at Barlinnie Prison by Harry Allen.  His last words are reported to have been: "Turn up the radio and I'll go quietly".

Around the time of his trial and execution, some newspapers published claims that Manuel was responsible for several other unsolved murders from the 1950s, but the evidence for this is tenuous at best, and in some cases he was in prison at the time.

Manuel was the third-to-last criminal to be executed in Scotland. Anthony Miller followed Manuel on to the Barlinnie gallows in December 1960, and Henry John Burnett was executed at Craiginches Prison, Aberdeen, in August 1963.

In 2009, a BBC programme Inside the Mind of a Psychopath argued that the authorities colluded to ensure Manuel was hanged. Manuel had been arrested only eight days after the City of Glasgow CID took over the case, leading to calls for the creation of a national police force.  A single Scottish police force was eventually created in 2013.

In fiction
 James G. Nunn portrays Manuel in Season 4 of Murder Maps on Netflix and UKTV.
 Brian Cox loosely based his portrayal of Hannibal Lecter in the film Manhunter on Manuel.
 In Dead Men and Broken Hearts, a novel by Craig Russell, Peter Manuel makes an appearance as a secondary character self-named "Sheriff Pete".
 In 2016, the broadcaster ITV commissioned a three-part drama called In Plain Sight based on the case. Manuel was portrayed by Martin Compston. 
 Denise Mina based her 2017 novel, The Long Drop, on Manuel.
 Peter Manuel was the only modern figure in the Chamber of Horrors section of the now-defunct Edinburgh Wax Museum on the Royal Mile.

See also
 List of serial killers in the United Kingdom

References

Notes

Sources
 MacLeod, Hector and McLeod, Malcolm Peter Manuel, Serial Killer
 Nicol, Allan Manuel: Scotland's First Serial Killer (with an introduction by Donald Findlay)
 Skelton, Douglas Glasgow's Black Heart: A City's Life of Crime
 MacKay, Donald Scotland's Hanged 1946 to 1963 (2016)

Cited works and further reading

External links
 BBC News Website (April 2008) Call to examine 50s killer case
 National Archives of Scotland Website (June 2008) The Mind of a Killer – the Peter Manuel Case
 Serial killer's voice to be heard
'Hanging With Frank' (video showing UK execution protocol at the old gallows in Barlinnie Prison)

1927 births
1956 murders in the United Kingdom
1957 murders in the United Kingdom
1958 deaths
1958 murders in the United Kingdom
20th-century American criminals
20th-century executions by Scotland
20th-century executions of American people
20th-century Scottish criminals
American emigrants to Scotland
American murderers of children
American people convicted of rape
American people convicted of sexual assault
American people executed abroad
British people convicted of sexual assault
Executed American serial killers
Executed British serial killers
Executed people from New York (state)
Executed Scottish people
Family murders
Male serial killers
People convicted of murder by Scotland
People executed by Scotland by hanging
People from Detroit
People from North Lanarkshire
Scottish murderers of children
Scottish people convicted of murder
Scottish people convicted of rape
Scottish serial killers